"The One Where Ross Is Fine" is the second episode of Friends tenth season. It first aired on the NBC network in the United States on October 2, 2003.

Plot
Rachel and Joey think Ross might have problems with their new relationship, but Ross assures them he is fine. Ross invites Rachel and Joey on a double-date with him and Charlie. They agree, but Ross gets drunk during the awkward date. Joey stays with Ross overnight to make sure he is okay and they talk. Ross realizes that he has been apart from Rachel for so long that he should not stop Joey and Rachel's relationship. He does give Joey his blessing even though it still hurts him, because they should see where the relationship is going.

Monica and Chandler are having trouble figuring out the adoption process, so Phoebe sends them to a couple who have adopted. Monica and Chandler meet them and Monica instantly gets along with the woman (Kellie Waymire); however later Chandler casually mentions to their son (Daryl Sabara) that he was adopted only to find out that he did not know about it. Chandler also reveals that Santa is not real. The couple then kick out Monica and Chandler after finding out about both things, and about Chandler trying to bribe him.

Phoebe hangs out with her brother Frank (Giovanni Ribisi) and his triplets. The kids are driving Frank crazy and he offers Phoebe one of them. He comes to the realization that he could not possibly give up any of the children so Phoebe offers to babysit so Frank and Alice will have more time to relax. The episode ends with Chandler accidentally revealing to the triplets that Phoebe gave birth to them; embarrassed, he leaves to tell Emma she was an accident.

Reception
In the original broadcast, the episode was viewed by 22.38 million viewers. Sam Ashurst from Digital Spy ranked the episode #5 on their ranking of the 236 Friends episodes. Telegraph & Argus ranked the episode #17 on their ranking of all 236 Friends episodes.

References

2003 American television episodes
Friends (season 10) episodes